Subramanian Gopalakrishnan is an Indian actor who has appeared in Malayalam and Tamil serials, as well as Tamil films.

Early life 
Subramanian's born and brought up was in Chennai, Tamil Nadu. He was a bright student right from school and was very much interested in extra-curricular activities. Subramanian did a series of odd jobs to continue is education: Accounts Assistant, Private Telecom Supervisor, Interior Decorator and Marketing manager in Polymer Industry. He graduated with B.B.A degree from Madras University in Chennai. After a brief stint in the interior decoration business, due to his interest in the acting career, he pursue an acting career.

Career 
Subramanian made his acting debut as a lead in Tamil Film as Srikumar called “Aavani Thingal” directed by Hari Krishna. He also worked as an associate director in Tamil movie's which are “Pachai Engira Kathu” and Karuppampatti. Later he started working in television Mega serials and he became an established Mega serial actor. His first work in television mega Serial is “Valli” in Tamil for Sun TV produced by Sare Gama. He also acted as a lead in Tamil serial called “Deivamagal” produced by Vikatan Televisions. Currently he is doing a Mega serial in Malayalam named “Chandanamazha” for Asianet channel produced by Mr. Jayakumar of Rosspetals Pvt Ltd which established him as the most sought after Malayalam television star. He won Asianet most popular actor award for consecutive 3 years from 2015 to 2017.

Filmography
As actor

Other roles
 Pachai Engira Kathu(2013) – Worked as an Assistant director
 Karuppampatti(2013) – Worked as an Assistant director

Television Serials

Awards and nominations

References

External links 
 

Living people
1986 births